Lijiang is a city in China's Yunnan province.

Lijiang may also refer to:

Old Town of Lijiang, World Heritage Site, in downtown Lijiang
Li River or Lijiang, river in Guangxi
Lijiang, Hengnan County, town in Hunan
Lijiang, Yuanjiang County, town in and seat of Yuanjiang Hani, Yi and Dai Autonomous County, Yunnan
Lijiang pony, a pony from Lijiang, Yunnan
14656 Lijiang, Main-belt asteroid

See also
Li Jiang (disambiguation), several people